is a passenger railway station located in Izumi-ku, Yokohama, Japan, operated by the private railway operator Sagami Railway (Sotetsu).

Lines 
Yayoidai Station is served by the Sagami Railway Izumino Line, and lies 4.9 kilometers from the starting point of the line at Futamatagawa Station.

Station layout
The station consists of two opposed side platforms serving two tracks, connected to the station building by a footbridge. The station is known for its cherry blossom in spring.

Platforms

Adjacent stations

History 
Yayoidai Station was opened on April 8, 1976. The station building was remodeled on September 30, 1998. From 27 October 2013, an experimental platform edge door system is to be installed for evaluation purposes on the down (Shōnandai-bound) platform. Originally scheduled to be introduced in the summer of 2013, the low-cost system developed by Takamisawa Cybernetics consists of three bars that are raised and lowered in front of the train doors, and will be installed for a length of one carriage on the down platform for a period of one year.

Passenger statistics
In fiscal 2019, the station was used by an average of 15,056 passengers daily.

The passenger figures for previous years are as shown below.

Surrounding area
 International Goodwill Hospital (Emergency Hospital)
Shimbashi Citizen's Forest
Hatonomoriainoshi Nursery School
Yayoidai Kindergarten
Yokohama City Shinbashi Elementary School

See also
 List of railway stations in Japan

References

External links 

 Sotetsu station information 

Railway stations in Kanagawa Prefecture
Railway stations in Japan opened in 1976
Railway stations in Yokohama